Brian Gerard Tickell (born 15 November 1939) is a former professional footballer, who played for Huddersfield Town, Carlisle United and Gateshead. He was born in Carlisle, Cumberland.

References

1939 births
Living people
English footballers
Footballers from Carlisle, Cumbria
Association football forwards
English Football League players
Huddersfield Town A.F.C. players
Carlisle United F.C. players
Gateshead F.C. players